Elections to City of Bradford Metropolitan District Council were held on were held on the same day as the general election, with one third of council up for election as well as double vacancies in Haworth, Oakworth & Oxenhope and Heaton. The University incumbent had defected from Labour to Independent Labour the year before. The election resulted in the Conservatives retaining control with voter turnout at 72.7%.

Election result

This result had the following consequences for the total number of seats on the council after the elections:

Ward results

References

Bradford Metropolitan District Council
1979
1970s in West Yorkshire